Peter Baker may refer to:

Sports
 Peter Baker (footballer, born 1931) (1931–2016), English footballer who played for Tottenham Hotspur in the 1950s and 1960s
 Peter Baker (footballer, born 1934), English footballer who played for Sheffield Wednesday in the 1950s and Queens Park Rangers in the 1960s
 Peter Baker (Australian footballer) (born 1940), Australian rules footballer
 Peter Baker (cricketer) (1945–2000), English cricketer
 Peter Baker (golfer) (born 1967), British golfer

Others
 Peter Baker (slave trader) (1731–1796), English slave trader
 Peter Baker (Canadian politician) (1887–1973), Lebanese-born Canadian trader, politician, and author
 Peter Baker (British politician) (1921–1966), British Conservative MP 
 Peter E. Baker (geologist) (1937–2008), British geologist
 Ginger Baker (Peter Edward Baker, 1939–2019), English drummer
 Peter Baker (journalist) (born 1967), American political journalist and author
 Peter S. Baker, designer of the typeface Junicode
 Peter Baker, a character from Australian soap opera Home and Away
 Peter Baker, a character from Australian soap opera Neighbours